The Northern Territory Minister for Public Employment is a Minister of the Crown in the Government of the Northern Territory. The minister administers their portfolio through the Office of the Commissioner for Public Employment.

The Minister is responsible for the development and coordination of public and private employment strategies, industrial relations and the public sector.

The current minister is Paul Kirby (Labor). He was sworn in on 8 September 2020 following the Labor victory at the 2020 election.

List of Ministers for Public Employment

Former posts

Employment

Industrial Relations

References

Northern Territory-related lists
Ministers of the Northern Territory government